Thomas Middleton (1580–1627) was an English playwright.

Thomas Middleton may also refer to:

Thomas Middleton (died 1429), MP for Southampton
Thomas Myddelton (younger) (1586–1666), Welsh politician, parliamentarian soldier during the English Civil War
Thomas Middleton (Sussex) (1589–1662), English politician who sat in the House of Commons variously between 1640 and 1660
Sir Thomas Middleton (1654–1702), MP for Harwich
Thomas Middleton (1676–1715), MP for Essex
Thomas Fanshawe Middleton (bishop) (1769–1822), Anglican bishop in India
Thomas Cooke Middleton (1842–1923), American priest
Sir Thomas Hudson Middleton (1863–1943), Statute 12 Fellows of the Royal Society
Thomas Percy Middleton (1893–?), British flying ace of World War I
Thomas M. Middleton (born 1945), American politician from Maryland

See also
Thomas Middleton Raysor (1895–1974), American literary scholar
Tom Middleton, English electronic recording artist
Tom Middleton (rower) (born 1976), British rower
Tom Middleton (Canadian singer), former Canadian pop singer
Thomas Myddelton (disambiguation)